York Hospital is a teaching hospital in York, England. It is  managed by York and Scarborough Teaching Hospitals NHS Foundation Trust, an NHS foundation trust which also runs several other hospitals in North Yorkshire and the East Riding of Yorkshire, including Scarborough Hospital, Bridlington Hospital and Malton Community Hospital.

History

The present facility on Wigginton Road, which replaced numerous other facilities, including Acomb Hospital, Deighton Grove Hospital, Fulford Hospital, the Military Hospital, Yearsley Bridge Hospital, York City Hospital and York County Hospital, was designed by Llewelyn-Davies, Weeks, Forestier-Walker and Bor and built and equipped at a cost of £12.5 million between 1971 and 1976. It was officially opened by Princess Alexandra on 28 July 1977.

Services
There is an urgent care centre at York Hospital which is open every day. Hospedia gives patients and staff entertainment and music through the day and night. It also provides some specialist shows, including live commentary from nearby York City Football Club. It has over 700 beds.

See also
 List of hospitals in England

References

External links

 NHS Choices

Hospital buildings completed in 1976
Hospitals in York
NHS hospitals in England
Teaching hospitals in England
Hospitals established in 1976
1976 establishments in England